Owen Lloyd "Ox" Parry (November 17, 1914 – March 2, 1976) was a professional American football tackle who played three seasons for the New York Giants.

References

1914 births
1976 deaths
American football tackles
Baylor Bears football players
New York Giants players
Players of American football from San Antonio